Andrea Naccari (12 August 1841 – 2 October 1919) is notable for his study of  the thermoelectric properties of metals, the photoelectric effect of metals immersed in liquids, and the electrical conductivity of gases and liquid dielectrics. He showed that the variation in the electrical resistance of distilled water was due largely to the solubility of the glass of the receptacle in which it was contained.

He obtained his PhD in pure maths in 1862 at the University of Padua under  Francesco Rossetti.

References
 Atti della R. Accad. delle Scienze di Torino 1927, 63, pp. 24–30.
 Nuovo Cimento [ser. 8] 1927, 4, pp. 49–59.

External links
 
 Naccari biography
 Naccari obituary

19th-century Italian physicists
19th-century Italian mathematicians
20th-century Italian mathematicians
1841 births
1919 deaths